Båtbogen (The boat bow) is a bay in Agardhbukta in Sabine Land at Spitsbergen, Svalbard. It is located east of Agardhelva and west of Belemnittsletta.

References

Bays of Spitsbergen